The Montevideo Cabildo (Spanish language: Cabildo de Montevideo) is the public building in Montevideo that was used as the government house during the colonial times of the Viceroyalty of the River Plate. Today the building is used as a museum and houses the Historical Archive of the city. It is located on Constitution Square, in Ciudad Vieja.

Further reading

External links

Museo y Archivo Histórico Municipal Cabildo - Intendencia Municipal de Montevideo

Cabildos
Neoclassical architecture in Uruguay
Buildings and structures in Montevideo
Viceroyalty of the Río de la Plata
Ciudad Vieja, Montevideo
Museums in Montevideo
History museums in Uruguay